Parihar is a Rajput clan.

Parihar may also refer to:
 Parihar Assembly constituency, a constituency in the Sitamarhi district of Bihar, India
 16174 Parihar, a main-belt asteroid named after 2002 Intel Science Talent Search finalist Raminder Kaur Parihar